Arkadiusz Chęciński (born 5 June 1971) - mayor of Sosnowiec, Polish entrepreneur and Councilor.

Memoir 
Arkadiusz Chęciński was born in Sosnowiec on 5 June 1971. He graduated Wyższa Szkoła Humanitas in Sosnowiec. He's associated with Civic Platform. In 2006 Chęciński unsuccessfully tried to get a City Council mandate. In next term of City Council he finally got a Councilor mandate. In 2013 he was elected to the management of Silesian Voivodeship.

Since 2014 Chęciński is the mayor of Sosnowiec city. In 2018 he was elected on second term (66,7% votes).

During the parliament campaign in 2019 he was supporting Mateusz Bochenek.

References 

1971 births
Living people
People from Sosnowiec
Civic Platform politicians
C
Mayors of places in Poland